Suwinit Panjamawat (born  1984) is a Thai actor. His roles include the teenaged title character in Jan Dara by director Nonzee Nimibutr and as the youthful Dum in Tears of the Black Tiger by Wisit Sasanatieng. He also appears in Nonzee's segment in the Asian cinema horror film collaboration, "The Wheel".

References

External links
 

1984 births
Living people
Suwinit Panjamawat
Suwinit Panjamawat
Suwinit Panjamawat
Place of birth missing (living people)